Welshly Arms is an American blues rock band from Cleveland, Ohio, United States. The band has been active since their debut in 2013 with the EP Welcome. The following year, they released a covers EP and in 2015, an album titled Welshly Arms. The band writes, produces, and records all of their material in Cleveland. Their name refers to a Saturday Night Live sketch. Their influences include Jimi Hendrix, The Temptations, Otis Redding, and Howlin' Wolf. Musicians from the band's hometown of Cleveland have also influenced them, such as The O'Jays, The James Gang, and The Black Keys.

Welshly Arms' music has been featured in trailers for two films: The D Train (starring Jack Black) and The Hateful Eight (directed by Quentin Tarantino). The song "Legendary" was chosen as the official theme song for WWE's 2017 TLC pay-per-view, as well as the national TV and radio campaign for the Cleveland Indians and a promo for the Netflix show Sense8 and it also features as one of the ending songs in the movie Den of Thieves. The song "Sanctuary" was featured in season 3 of Lucifer and the 9-1-1 season 2 finale.
The band's song "Legendary" has also featured at the end of an episode of Shades of Blue and was also used in the menu soundtrack of the popular video game Asphalt 9: Legends.

Members
Current Members
 Sam Getz – lead vocals, guitar
 Jimmy Weaver – bass, vocals
 Mikey Gould – drums
 Bri Bryant – vocals
 Jon Bryant – vocals
While Welshly Arms' website lists five official band members, concert performances after Brett Lindemann's departure have included Cleveland-based musician Nate Saggio on the keyboard, coupled with his appearances on the band's social media posts.

Past Members

 Brett Lindemann – keyboard, vocals

Discography
Studio albums
Welshly Arms (Position Music, 2015)
No Place Is Home (Position Music, 2018)
Wasted Words & Bad Decisions (2023)

EPs
Welcome EP (2013)
Covers EP (2014)
Legendary EP (2017) 

Singles

References

External links

 http://welshlyarms.com - official site

American rock music groups
Musical groups from Cleveland